Geoffrey Ghesquière  (born 6 December 1989) is a Belgian footballer who plays for Olympic Charleroi.

Career 
Ghesquiere began his career with Belgian in Namur based club MFC Fontenelle, followed by Stations in France for Ferrain Association Neuvilloise in Neuville-en-Ferrain, Belgian club KFC Lille and another French side ES Wasquehal. In summer 2004 left Wasquehal and joined to French top club AJ Auxerre. After five years in France with AJ Auxerre joined back to his homeland Belgium to sign with Cercle Brugge K.S.V. Ghequière moved in January 2009 from Cercle to K.M.S.K. Deinze who played three games. He played in this half year at Deinze only three games and was sold on 30 June 2009 a contract with K.S.V. Roeselare. After three year in Belgian, returned to France and signed for Sporting Club de Feignies. Ghesquière played by Feignies, 43 games and scored six goals, before signed in January 2014 by Olympique Saint-Quentin.

On 22 June 2020 it was confirmed by Olympic Charleroi, that Ghesquière had joined the club.

Personal life 
His younger brother, Jérémy Ghesquière, is also a footballer who among others played for Namur based club MFC Fontenelle.

References

1989 births
Living people
Belgian footballers
Belgian expatriate footballers
Association football defenders
Cercle Brugge K.S.V. players
K.S.V. Roeselare players
K.V. Kortrijk players
AJ Auxerre players
K.M.S.K. Deinze players
Wasquehal Football players
Entente Feignies Aulnoye FC players
Olympique Saint-Quentin players
Olympique Grande-Synthe players
UR La Louvière Centre players
Belgian Pro League players
Championnat National 3 players
Belgian Third Division players
Belgian expatriate sportspeople in France
Expatriate footballers in France